Isophthalonitrile is an organic compound with the formula C6H4(CN)2.  Two other isomers exist, phthalonitrile and terephthalonitrile.  All three isomers are produced commercially by ammoxidation of the corresponding xylene isomers.  Isophthalonitrile is a colorless or white solid with low solubility in water. Hydrogenation of isophthalonitrile affords m-xylylenediamine, a curing agent in epoxy resins and a component of some urethanes.

Safety
LD50 (rat, oral) is 288 mg/kg.

References

Benzonitriles